Hans Adler may refer to:
Hans Adler (poet) (1880–1957), German poet
Hans Adler (business), food industry business
Hans G. Adler (1904–1979), musician, musicologist and collector in South Africa
H. G. Adler (1910–1988), German writer
Hans Hermann Adler (1891–1956), German professor of journalism at the University of Heidelberg

See also
 Samuel Hans Adler (born 1928), German-born American composer

Adler, Hans